is a Japanese former track cyclist who won the sprint competition at the 1987 UCI Track Cycling World Championships, along with bronze medals in the same event in 1986 and 1988. He was also a professional keirin cyclist with over 400 wins.

References

1964 births
Living people
Japanese male cyclists
UCI Track Cycling World Champions (men)
Sportspeople from Hokkaido
Japanese track cyclists
People from Asahikawa